"It Would Be You" is a song written by Kent Robbins and Dana Hunt Black and recorded by American country music artist Gary Allan.  It was released in February 1998 as the first single and title track from Allan's 1998 album of the same name. It reached No. 7 on the U.S. Billboard Hot Country Singles and Tracks chart, remaining in the Top 10 after 21 weeks of radio play. As a result, this song became Allan's second Top 10 hit on the country charts, after his debut single "Her Man" in 1996–1997, which also reached No. 7.

Chart performance

Year-end charts

Music video
The music video premiered on The CMT Delivery Room on February 14, 1998, and was directed by Gerry Wenner.

References

Allmusic

1998 singles
1998 songs
Gary Allan songs
Songs written by Kent Robbins
Song recordings produced by Byron Hill
Song recordings produced by Mark Wright (record producer)
Decca Records singles